Andrew James Philip Joslin (born 18 December 1989) is an English former first-class cricketer.

Joslin was born at Leytonstone in December 1989 and was educated at Trinity Catholic High School, before going up to Anglia Ruskin University. While studying at Anglia Ruskin, he made two appearances in first-class cricket for Cambridge UCCE/MCCU against Essex in 2009 and Surrey in 2010. He scored 74 runs in his two matches, with a high score of 33.

Notes and references

External links

1989 births
Living people
People from Leytonstone
Alumni of Anglia Ruskin University
English cricketers
Cambridge MCCU cricketers